
Crilly may refer to:

Fictional characters 
 Father Ted Crilly, the title character of the TV situation comedy Father Ted

Organisations 
 Crilly Airways, British former airline

People 
 Mark Crilly (born 1980), Scottish footballer and football manager
 Sarah Crilly (born 1991), Scottish footballer
 Michael Crilly (born 1983), English amateur footballer and motocross rider

Places 
 Crilly Hill, hill in the Queen Maud Mountains, Antarctica

See also 
 Crilley, a surname